Sorlin may refer to:

People:
Olivier Sorlin (born 1979), French football midfielder, currently playing for PAOK F.C. of Thessaloniki

Places:
Montmelas-Saint-Sorlin
Saint-Sorlin, Rhône
Saint-Sorlin-d'Arves
Saint-Sorlin-de-Conac
Saint-Sorlin-de-Morestel
Saint-Sorlin-de-Vienne
Saint-Sorlin-en-Bugey
Saint-Sorlin-en-Valloire